Mineralientage München is the largest mineral show in Europe, held in the Bavarian city of Munich (München in German), a few weeks after the  Oktoberfest. It began in 1964 and celebrated its 50th edition in 2014.

Overview
The fair takes place in late October or early November at the new Trade Fair Center built on the fields of the old Munich airport. With an area over 36,000 m2, it is divided into three pavilions, it has more than 1,000 exhibitors, from more than 50 countries, and they show a very wide variety of minerals, fossils, gems and jewelry.

Every year, the Mineral Show includes a monographic theme: Opal from Australia (2008), Minerals from the Himalayan Mountains (2007), The Mineral Treasures of the Houston Museum (2006), The Beauty of Agates (2005) ... With other themed exhibitions and conferences as well.

The three pavilions, of nearly 12,000 m2 each, focus on minerals, gems and jewelry. In the central pavilion there is a special area where you could see the “super mineral pieces”, called the VIP area.

Since 2007, there has been a new Alpine Area. Selected strahlers (mineral hunters) from Germany, Italy, Austria, Switzerland and France display their new finds made in the highest alpine mountains like Mont Blanc massif.

See also
Mineral collecting
Tucson Gem and Mineral Show

References

External links 
 The Official Mineralientage Website
 Some information about past editions of Mineralientage München

Festivals in Munich
Trade fairs in Germany
Mineralogy